The Identity Cards Act 2006 (c. 15) was an Act of the Parliament of the United Kingdom that was repealed in 2011. It created national identity cards, a personal identification document and European Economic Area  travel document, linked to a database known as the National Identity Register (NIR), which has since been destroyed.

The introduction of the scheme by the Labour government was much debated, and various concerns about the scheme were expressed by human rights lawyers, activists, security professionals and IT experts, as well as politicians. Many of the concerns focused on the databases underlying the identity cards rather than the cards themselves. The Act specified fifty categories of information that the National Identity Register could hold on each citizen, including up to 10 fingerprints, digitised facial scan and iris scan, current and past British and overseas places of residence of all residents of the UK throughout their lives and indexes to other Government databases (including National Insurance Number) – which would allow them to be connected. The legislation on this resident register also said that any further information could be added.

The legislation further said that those renewing or applying for passports must be entered on to the NIR. It was expected that this would happen soon after the Identity and Passport Service (IPS), which was formerly the UK Passport Service, started interviewing passport applicants to verify their identity.

The Conservative/Liberal Democrat Coalition formed after the 2010 general election announced that the ID card scheme would be scrapped. The Identity Cards Act was repealed by the Identity Documents Act 2010 on 21 January 2011, and the cards were invalidated with no refunds to purchasers. Foreign nationals from outside the European Union, however, continue to require an ID card for use as a biometric residence permit under the provisions of the UK Borders Act 2007 and the Borders, Citizenship and Immigration Act 2009.

Only workers in certain high-security professions, such as airport workers, were required to have an identity card in 2009, and this general lack of compulsory ID remains the case today. Therefore, driving licences, particularly the photocard driving licence introduced in 1998, along with passports, are now the most widely used ID documents in the United Kingdom. Nobody in the UK is required to carry any form of ID. In everyday situations most authorities, such as the police, do not make spot checks of identification for individuals, although they may do so in instances of arrest. Some banks will accept a provisional driving licence only from young people, the upper age limit for which varies from bank to bank, while others will accept it from all ages.

Development

Reasons given for the need for introduction

Initial attempts to introduce a voluntary identity card were made under the Conservative government of John Major, under then Home Secretary Michael Howard. At the Labour Party conference in 1995, Tony Blair demanded that "instead of wasting hundreds of millions of pounds on compulsory ID cards as the Tory Right demand, let that money provide thousands more police officers on the beat in our local communities." It was included in the Conservative election manifesto for the 1997 general election, in which Labour returned to office.

A proposal for ID cards, to be called "entitlement cards", was initially revived by the Home Secretary at the time, David Blunkett, following the terrorist attacks of 11 September 2001, but was reportedly opposed by Cabinet colleagues. However, rising concerns about identity theft and the misuse of public services led to a proposal in February 2002 for the introduction of entitlement cards to be used to obtain social security services, and a consultation paper, Entitlement Cards and Identity Fraud, was published by the Home Office on 3 July 2002. A public consultation process followed, which resulted in a majority of submissions by organisations being in favour of a scheme to verify a person's identity accurately. However, it was clear that the ability to properly identify a person to their true identity was central to the proposal's operation, with wider implications for operations against crime and terrorism.

In 2003, Blunkett announced that the Government intended to introduce a "British national identity card" linked to a national identity database, the National Identity Register. The proposals were included in the November 2003 Queen's Speech, despite doubts over the ability of the scheme to prevent terrorism. Feedback from the consultation exercise indicated that the term "entitlement card" was superficially softer and warmer, but less familiar and "weaselly", and consequently the euphemism was dropped in favour of "identity card".

During a private seminar for the Fabian Society in August 2005, Tony McNulty, the minister in charge of the scheme, stated "perhaps in the past the government, in its enthusiasm, oversold the advantages of identity cards", and that they "did suggest, or at least implied, that they might well be a panacea for identity fraud, for benefit fraud, terrorism, entitlement and access to public services". He suggested that they should be seen as "a gold standard in proving your identity". Documentation released by the Home Office demonstrated analysis conducted with the private and public sector showed the benefits of the proposed identity card scheme could be quantified at £650m to £1.1bn a year, with a number of other, less quantifiable, strategic benefits — such as disrupting the activities of organised crime and terrorist groups.

Legislative progress
The Identity Cards Bill was included in the Queen's Speech on 23 November 2004, and introduced to the House of Commons on 29 November.

It was first voted on by Members of Parliament following the second reading of the bill on 20 December 2004, where it passed by 385 votes to 93. The bill was opposed by 19 Labour MPs, 10 Conservative MPs, and the Liberal Democrats, while a number of Labour and Conservative members abstained, in defiance of party policies. A separate vote on a proposal to reject the Bill was defeated by 306 votes to 93. Charles Clarke, the new Home Secretary, had earlier rejected calls to postpone the reading of the Bill following his recent appointment.

The third reading of the bill in the Commons was approved on 11 February 2005 by 224 votes to 64; a majority of 160. Although being in favour in principle, the Conservatives officially abstained, but 11 of their MPs joined 19 Labour MPs in voting against the Government. The Bill then passed to the House of Lords, but there was insufficient time to debate the matter, and Labour were unable to do a deal with the Conservatives in the short time available in the days before Parliament was dissolved on 11 April, following the announcement of the 2005 general election.

Labour's manifesto for the 2005 general election stated that, if returned to power, they would "introduce ID cards, including biometric data like fingerprints, backed up by a national register and rolling out initially on a voluntary basis as people renew their passports". In public speeches and on the campaign trail, Labour made clear that they would bring the same Bill back to Parliament. In contrast, the Liberal Democrat manifesto opposed the idea because, they claimed, ID cards "don’t work", while the Conservatives made no mention of the issue.

After the 2005 election
Following their 2005 general election victory, the Labour Government introduced a new Identity Cards Bill, substantially the same as the previous Bill, into the Commons on 25 May. The Conservatives joined the Liberal Democrats in opposing the Bill, saying that it did not pass their "five tests". These tests included confidence that the scheme could be made to work, and its impact on civil liberties. In December 2005, the Conservative Party elected a new leader, future Prime Minister David Cameron, who opposed ID cards in principle.

The second reading of the Bill on 28 June was passed, 314 votes to 283, a majority of 31.

At its third reading in the Commons on 18 October, the majority in favour fell to 25, with 309 votes in favour to 284 against. In the report stage between the readings, the Bill was amended to prevent the National Identity Register database being linked to the Police National Computer.

In early 2006, the Bill was passed through the House of Lords committee stage, where 279 amendments were considered. One outcome of this was a vote demanding that the Government instruct the National Audit Office to provide a full costing of the scheme over its first ten years, and another demanding that a "secure and reliable method" of recording and storing the data should be found. A third defeat limited the potential for ID cards to be required before people could access public services. On 23 January, the House of Lords defeated the government by backing a fully voluntary scheme.

The committee stage ended on 30 January, and the third reading of the Bill took place on 6 February, after which it returned to the Commons. There, on 18 February, the legislation was carried by a majority of 25, with 25 Labour MPs joining those opposing it. Following the defeats in the House of Lords, the government changed the Bill in order to require separate legislation to make the cards compulsory; however, an amendment to make it possible to apply for a biometric passport without having to register on the National Identity Register database was defeated, overturning the Lords' changes to make the Bill fully voluntary. The Lords' amendment requiring a National Audit Office report was rejected.

The Bill returned to the Lords on 6 March, where the Commons amendments were reversed by a majority of 61. The defeat came despite ministers warning that the Lords should follow the Salisbury Convention by refraining from blocking a manifesto commitment. Both Conservatives and Liberal Democrats stated generally in 2005 that they no longer felt bound to abide by the convention, while in this specific case several Lords stated that it would not apply as the manifesto commitment was for implementation on a "voluntary basis" as passports are renewed, rather than being compulsory as passports are renewed.

Subsequent votes:
13 March: House of Commons — majority of 33 for Government (310 to 277)
15 March: House of Lords — majority of 35 against Government (218 to 183)
16 March: House of Commons — majority of 51 for Government (292 to 241)
20 March: House of Lords — majority of 36 against Government (211 to 175)
21 March: House of Commons — majority of 43 for Government (284 to 241)

On 29 March, the House of Lords voted in favour of a new plan with a majority of 227 (287 to 60). Under this scheme, everyone renewing a passport from 2008 would be issued an ID card and have their details placed on the national ID card database. The Government said that until 2010, people could choose not to be issued a card, though they would still have to pay for one, and still be placed on the database.

The Bill received Royal assent on 30 March 2006.

Timescale and implementation progress
On 11 October 2006, the Labour government announced a timescale described as "highly ambitious" by computer experts. The Home Office announced that it would publish an ID management action plan in the months from November 2006, followed by agreements with departments on their uses for the system. There was to be a report on potential private sector uses for the scheme before the 2007 Budget.

On 25 September 2006, Home Office Minister Liam Byrne said that "There are opportunities which give me optimism to think that actually there is a way of exploiting systems already in place in a way which brings down the costs quite substantially".

Emails leaked in June 2006 indicated that the plan was already in difficulty, with plans for the early introduction of a limited register and ID card with reduced biometrics known as the "early variant" described as a "huge risk".

Due to the costs of developing a new system from scratch, in 2007, the Government approved an alternative plan to use the Department for Work and Pensions Customer Information System to store the biographical information, linked to a new database to store biometrics, despite concerns over issues of inter-departmental governance, funding and accountability which were never resolved.

The schedule for putting passport applicants' and renewers' details on the National Identity Register (NIR) was never announced. A nationwide network of 68 interview offices for first-time passport applicants started opening in June 2007 and was subsequently completed. The interview consisted mainly of asking applicants to confirm facts about themselves, which someone attempting to steal their identity may not know. The government stated that all personal information used in the interview not required for the application was destroyed shortly after the passport was issued. Fingerprints were not taken. Plans to take iris scans were dropped, although the Government had not ruled them out as a future option.

In March 2008, the Home Secretary announced that people could choose to have an identity card, a passport, or both when they became available (although they could not opt out of having their details recorded on the NIR). On 25 November 2008, people making applications to remain in the United Kingdom as a student or based on marriage were required to have an identity card. Under those plans, it was estimated that by the end of 2014–15 about 90% of all foreign nationals would have been issued with one. On 22 January 2008, the Home Office confirmed that large numbers of cards would not be issued until 2012; however, ID cards were issued to workers in critical locations, starting with airside workers in Manchester and London City airports in 2009, and young people were being offered cards in 2010.

A leaked document, published on 29 January 2008, suggested that "universal compulsion should not be used unless absolutely necessary... due the need for inevitably controversial and time-consuming primary legislation" but that "various forms of coercion, such as designation of the application process for identity documents issued by British ministers (e.g. passports) were an option to stimulate applications in a manageable way".

In January 2008, the Financial Times reported that Accenture and BAE Systems had withdrawn from the procurement process. Fujitsu Services, CSC, EDS, IBM, Steria and Thales Group were still negotiating framework agreements with the government.

On 1 August 2008, it was confirmed that Thales Group was awarded a four-year contract to work on the design, building, testing and operation of the National Identity Scheme.

On 25 September 2008, Jacqui Smith unveiled replicas of the first actual cards to be issued as residence permits to foreign nationals.

The first to receive ID cards were foreign nationals, from 25 November 2008 until the programme's cancellation. National Identity Cards for British nationals became available to people resident in the Greater Manchester area on 30 November 2009. Ordinary British citizens were then meant to be offered (on a voluntary basis at first, but later in larger volumes) ID cards from 2011 to 2012. A Home Office minister, Meg Hillier, said that they would be a "convenient" way for young people to prove their age when going to bars and that at £30 they were cheaper than purchasing passports, although the total cost including processing fees was expected to be up to £60, more expensive than a passport cost before the introduction of the ID card and database scheme the Conservatives and Liberal Democrats criticised the increase in passport costs as being needed for the ID card scheme. In December 2009, while on a trip to promote identity cards, then Parliamentary Under-Secretary for Identity Meg Hillier had to admit she had forgotten hers and was left unable to display one for photographers.

Pilot schemes and partial rollouts
 Non-EU foreign nationals on student or marriage/civil partnership visas (compulsory) – from November 2008 until the programme's cancellation, non-European Union foreign nationals with permission to stay in the UK on the basis of a student visa or a marriage/civil partnership visa would, when applying to extend their stay, be required to apply for an ID card.
 Air industry staff (compulsory) (cancelled) – a pilot scheme involving compulsory IDs for 30,000 air industry staff, planned to start in September 2009 at Manchester and London City airports, was cancelled in June 2009, after substantial opposition from unions.
 Greater Manchester residents (voluntary) – a pilot scheme open to all residents of Greater Manchester, from October 2009, which was expanded to Merseyside, then the rest of the North-West in early 2010. 13,200 people signed up. The Manchester Evening News revealed in 2010 that senior Whitehall officials were urged to email friends and relatives encouraging them to buy cards, because of fears about the level of demand.
 Air industry staff (voluntary) – a pilot scheme involving free, voluntary ID cards for airside workers began in November 2009 until the programme's cancellation at Manchester and London City airports.
 Young people opening bank accounts (voluntary) – in 2010, young people would have been encouraged to get ID cards when they opened bank accounts.
 London residents (voluntary) – was a planned pilot scheme in 2010 open to all residents of London.
 Citizens over the age of 16 if registered for IPS newsletter updates (voluntary), begun in 2010
 Citizens over the age of 16 applying for a passport intended in 2011–2012, optional, but applicants' details would have been entered into the National Identity Register

2010 general election
During the 2010 general election campaign, the published manifestos of the various parties revealed that the Labour Party planned to continue the introduction of the identity card scheme, while all other parties pledged to discontinue plans to issue ID cards. The Conservative Party also explicitly pledged to scrap the National Identity Register, while the wording of several other manifestos implied that this may have been the position of certain other parties too.

Ending of the scheme

In the Conservative–Liberal Democrat coalition agreement that followed the 2010 general election, the new government announced that they planned to scrap the ID card scheme, including the National Identity Register (as well as the next generation of biometric passports and the ContactPoint database), as part of their measures "to reverse the substantial erosion of civil liberties under the Labour Government and roll back state intrusion."

In a document published in May 2010 at the time of the Queen's Speech, the new Government announced that the scrapping of the scheme would save approximately £86,000,000 over the following 4 years, and avoid a further £800,000,000 in maintenance costs over the decade which were to have been recovered through fees.

On 27 May 2010, the draft Identity Documents Act 2010 was published with the aim of having it passed into law by August 2010. The government missed this target but expected the bill to become law before the new year. The Bill was passed by the House of Commons on 15 September 2010 and received Royal Assent on 21 December 2010. Section 1(1) of the Identity Documents Act repealed the Identity Cards Act 2006 on 21 January 2011 (making all ID cards invalid) and mandated the destruction of all data on the National Identity Register by 21 February 2011.

The register was officially destroyed on Thursday, 10 February 2011, when the final 500 hard drives containing the register were shredded at RDC in Witham, Essex.

Home Office Minister Damian Green said: "This marks the final end of the identity card scheme: dead, buried and crushed... What we are destroying today is the last elements of the national identity register, which was always the most objectionable part of the scheme."

A banker from Germany with joint British and Swiss nationality was arguably the last person to officially use the ID card on a flight from Düsseldorf to Manchester on 21 January 2011, landing 90 minutes before the scheme was officially scrapped at midnight.

Historical and international comparisons

ID cards during the World Wars

Compulsory identity cards were first issued in the United Kingdom during World War I, and abandoned in 1919. Cards were re-introduced during World War II under the National Registration Act 1939, but were abandoned seven years after the end of that war, in 1952, amid widespread public resentment. The National Register however, became the National Health Service Register and is maintained to this day.

The World War I identity card scheme was highly unpopular, though accepted in the light of the prevailing national emergency. It is possible to take a small measure of how the national identity scheme was received from remarks by the historian A. J. P. Taylor in his English History, 1914–1945, where he describes the whole thing as an "indignity" and talks of the Home Guard "harassing" people for their cards.

After the Second World War the government of Clement Attlee decided to continue the scheme in the face of the Cold War and the perceived Soviet threat, though it grew ever less popular. In the mind of the public it was more and more associated with bureaucratic interference and regulation, reflected, most particularly, in the 1949 comedy film Passport to Pimlico. Identity cards also became the subject of a celebrated civil liberties case in 1950. Harry Willcock, a member of the Liberal Party, refused to produce his after being stopped by the police. During his subsequent trial he argued that identity cards had no place in peacetime, a defence rejected by the magistrate's court. In his subsequent appeal, Willcock v Muckle, the judgment of the lower court was upheld.

Protest reached Parliament, where the Conservative and Liberal peers voiced their anger over what they saw as "Socialist card-indexing".  After the defeat of the Labour Government in the general election of October 1951 the incoming Conservative administration of Winston Churchill was pledged to get rid of the scheme, "to set the people free", in the words of one minister. Cheers rang out when on 21 February 1952 the Minister for Health, Harry Crookshank, announced in the House of Commons that national identity cards were to be scrapped. This was a popular move, adopted against the wishes of the police and the security services, though the decision to repeal the 1939 legislation was, in significant part, driven by the need for economies. By 1952 national registration was costing £500,000 per annum and required 1500 civil servants to administer it.

International comparisons

Identity cards
During the British Presidency of the EU in 2005, a decision was made to "agree common standards for security features and secure issuing procedures for ID cards (December 2005), with detailed standards agreed as soon as possible thereafter. In this respect, the British Presidency has put forward a proposal for EU-wide use of biometrics in national ID cards."

Australia started work on a health and social services access card, but the government elected in the 2007 federal election cancelled it.

Belgium introduced the Electronic identity card, or eID card, from 2004. By 2012, it was compulsory for every citizen in Belgium to hold an e-ID card for identity purposes. A variant exists for children, but that is not compulsory.

Biometrics in identity and travel documents
There has been an international move towards the introduction of biometrics into identity and travel documents. The ICAO has recommended that all countries adopt biometric passports, and the United States has made it a requirement for entering the US under the visa waiver programme. Biometric border control systems have been established in the United States and the United Arab Emirates, and the EU is introducing biometric visas. Internationally, the only requirement for biometric passports is a digital photograph.

System

Legal requirements

Under the NIS, residents who wanted or were required to apply for an ID card would have been required to fulfil certain functions:

Attend in person to have their fingerprints recorded at one of the Identity & Passport Service's high street partners.
Promptly inform the police or Identity & Passport Service if a card is lost or damaged, and apply for a new card.
Promptly inform the Identity & Passport Service of any change of address.
Promptly inform the Identity & Passport Service of any prescribed change of circumstances affecting the information recorded about them in the Register.

Failure to do so would have meant a penalty of up to £1,000 or a shortened permission to stay.

National Identity Register
Key to the ID Card scheme was a centralised computer database, the National Identity Register (NIR). To identify someone it would not have been necessary to check their card, since identity could be determined by a taking a biometric scan and matching it against a database entry.

ID cards for foreign nationals were produced by the Driver and Vehicle Licensing Agency (DVLA) in Swansea on behalf of the Home Office.

Identity Registration Number
One entry on the NIR was the Identity Registration Number. The Home Office had recognised that a unique identifier was needed as a primary key for the database.

The Home Office's Identity Cards Benefits Overview document described how the IRN would have enabled data sharing amongst police databases (including the Police DNA database), legal databases, and even corporate databases (including bank and travel operators).

Types of cards
Three types of identity cards were issued:

 The National Identity Card, which was lilac and salmon in colour, was issued to British citizens only.  It contained the text "British Citizen" and was a valid travel document for entry into any EEA state and Switzerland until its invalidation in 2010.
 The Identification Card was turquoise and green in colour and did not mention the holder's nationality. It was issued to EU, EEA and Swiss citizens living in the UK (including Irish citizens living in Northern Ireland).  It was also issued to certain family members of EU/EEA citizens, to British citizens to whom certain conditions or restrictions apply, and as an additional card to a person living in two gender roles.
 The Identity Card for Foreign Nationals was blue and pink in colour and was issued to certain categories of immigrants from non-EU/EEA countries.

Use as travel document
Until midnight on 21 January 2011, the National Identity Card was officially recognised as a valid travel document by the EEA and Switzerland, following which the United Kingdom instructed immigration authorities therein to cease accepting it as a valid travel document. It also became accepted voluntarily by a number of other European countries but its current validity in these additional countries remains unclear, given that its acceptance and subsequent denial by these countries was never mandated by the United Kingdom through EU or EEA channels. It was the only travel document valid for use by British nationals throughout the EEA and Switzerland, other than a valid British citizen passport or a pink Gibraltar identity card.  The exception to this was for travel to the Republic of Ireland.  All British citizens are entitled to enter the Republic of Ireland without the need to carry a valid travel document, on account of the Common Travel Area agreement, though in practice, the Irish Naturalisation and Immigration Service or Garda Síochána systematically require proof of identity from all travellers landing in Irish airports from the UK.

  European Union
  (EEA)
  (EEA)
  (EEA)
 

It became accepted also by:
 
  "Any travel document recognised by France or Spain"
 
 
 
 
 
 
  (only for tours organised by a travel agency for groups of more than three people)
 
 
 

It was also accepted as a travel document to enter the British Crown Dependencies and the British Overseas Territories:
  Part of EU
  Part of Common Travel Area — no travel document required to enter from the UK. (NB: Air travellers require photo ID for airline security purposes.)
  Part of Common Travel Area — no travel document required to enter from the UK. (NB: Air travellers require photo ID for airline security purposes.)
  Part of Common Travel Area — no travel document required to enter from the UK. (NB: Air travellers require photo ID for airline security purposes.)
All other overseas territories require a fully valid passport. Of the two countries closest to the UK not to accept British ID cards, Ukraine and Belarus, the latter requires not only a passport but also for British citizens to obtain a visa in advance (except if entering and exiting through Minsk airport and staying for max 5 days).

Controversially, some travel companies initially refused to carry passengers with UK National Identity Cards.

Reaction

The announcement of the scheme had seen a mixed reaction from both the public and from figures connected to terrorism and law enforcement.

Public reaction

Over a period of time, public opinion, as measured by opinion polls, appears to have shifted away from support for the scheme towards opposition. This appeared to have become more of a concern since the disclosure of the loss of 25 million records by HM Revenue and Customs.

In 2003, the announcement of the scheme was followed by a public consultation exercise, particularly among 'stakeholder groups'. At March 2003 the government stated that the overall results were:

in favour: 2606 responses (61%)
against:   1587 responses (38%)
neutral:     48 responses (1%)

By July 2006, an ICM poll indicated that public support had fallen to 46%, with opposition at 51%.

A further poll by YouGov/Daily Telegraph, published on 4 December 2006, indicated support for the identity card element of the scheme at 50%, with 39% opposed. Support for the national database was weaker, with 22% happy and 78% unhappy with the prospect of having their data recorded. Only 11% trusted the government to keep the data confidential. 3.12% of the sample were prepared to undergo long prison sentences rather than have a card.

Terrorism and crime
Eliza Manningham-Buller, the former head of Britain's counter-intelligence and security agency MI5 was on record as supporting the introduction of identity cards, as was Sir Ian Blair, former Commissioner of the Metropolitan Police and his predecessor, Sir John (now Lord) Stevens. The Association of Chief Police Officers was also supportive.

However, in November 2005, Dame Stella Rimington, who was Director General of MI5 before Eliza Manningham-Buller, questioned the usefulness of the proposed scheme.
This intervention caused a good deal of controversy amongst supporters and opponents of the scheme, especially as Manningham-Buller stated that ID cards would in fact disrupt the activities of terrorists, noting that significant numbers of terrorists take advantage of the weaknesses of current identification methods to assist their activities.

Lord Carlile was appointed after 11 September attacks on New York and Washington in 2001 to independently review the working of the Terrorism Act 2000 and subsequent anti-terrorist laws. Talking on GMTV on 29 January 2006, he expressed his views on the proposed legislation, saying that ID cards could be of limited value in the fight against terrorism but that Parliament had to judge that value against the curtailment of civil liberties. Speaking on the same programme, Lord Stevens of Kirkwhelpington, former Met Police Commissioner, argued in favour for the need for identity cards, saying they had benefits in tackling serious crimes, such as money laundering and identity theft.

Objections to the scheme

Costs
Independent studies including one by the London School of Economics had suggested that costs could be as much as £12 billion to £18 billion. The reliability of this study was challenged by the Labour Government which disputed some of the assumptions used in the calculations, such as the need to retake biometric information every 5 years. The government argued that this assumption had not been supported by any research in the London School of Economics report, and that biometric experts quoted in the LSE reports had sought to distance themselves from its findings. The Government also claimed that the authors of these estimates were established opponents to the scheme and could not be considered unbiased academic sources.

Tony McNulty, Home Office minister who was responsible for the scheme, responded by saying a "ceiling" on costs would be announced in October 2005. There were indications that the Labour Government was looking at ways of subsidising the scheme by charging other Government Departments, with the implication that this would result in increased charges for other Government services to individuals or businesses.

After the 2005 general election, the Home Office stated that it would cost £584 million a year to run the scheme. In October 2006, the Government declared it would cost £5.4bn to run the ID cards scheme for the next 10 years. In May 2007, the Home Office forecast a cost rise of £400m to £5.3 billion, a figure revised in November 2007 to £5.612bn.

The Labour Government abandoned plans for a giant new computer system to run the national identity card scheme. Instead of a single multibillion-pound system, information was held on three existing, separate databases.

An estimate from the Home Office placed the cost of a 10-year passport and ID card package at £85, while after the 2005 general election in May 2005 they issued a revised figure of over £93, and announced that a "standalone" ID card would cost £30. In 2009, it was announced that retailers would be collecting fingerprints and photographs, and that they would be able to charge for this, meaning that the total cost for a standalone ID card was expected to be up to £60.

Effectiveness
The then Home Secretary David Blunkett stated in 2004 said the cards would stop people using multiple identities and boost the fight against terrorism and organised crime. However, human rights group Liberty disputed this, pointing out that the existence of another form of ID cards in Spain did not prevent the Madrid train bombings.

However, Blunkett subsequently made a significant U-turn. At his opening speech for Infosecurity Europe on 27 April 2009, he stepped back from the concept of a full National Identity Database for every citizen, saying it would be sufficient to improve the verification of passports.

His successor, Charles Clarke, said that ID cards "cannot stop attacks", in the aftermath of the 7 July 2005 London bombings, and added that he doubted it would have prevented the atrocities. However, he felt that on the balance between protecting civil liberties and preventing crime, ID cards would help rather than hinder.

Ethnic minorities
The Government's Race Equality Impact Assessment indicated significant concern among ethnic groups over how the police would use their powers under an Identity Cards Act 2006, with 64% of black and 53% of Indian respondents having expressed concern, particularly about the potential for abuse and discrimination. In their January 2005 report on the Bill, the Commission for Racial Equality stated that the fear of discrimination is neither misconceived nor exaggerated, and note that this is also an ongoing issue in Germany, the Netherlands and France.

The CRE were also concerned that disproportionate requirements by employers and the authorities for ethnic minorities to identify themselves may lead to a two-tiered structure amongst racial groups, with foreign nationals and British ethnic minorities feeling compelled to register while British white people do not.

According to the CRE, certain groups who move location frequently and who tend to live on low incomes (such as Gypsies, travellers, asylum-seekers and refugees) would risk being criminalised under the legislation through failing to update their registration each time they moved due to lack of funds to pay the fee that may be charged.

Concerns raised by the Information Commissioner
In a press release on 30 July 2004, Richard Thomas the Information Commissioner's Office stated that
a NIR raised substantial data protection and personal privacy concerns. He sought clarification of why so much personal information needed to be kept as part of establishing an individual's identity and indicated concern about the wide range of bodies who would view the records of services individuals have used. The Commissioner also pointed out that those who renew or apply for a driving licence or passport were to be automatically added to the National Identity Register, and so would lose the option of not registering. He subsequently stated: "My anxiety is that we don't sleepwalk into a surveillance society."
In February 2003, on BBC Radio 4's Today programme, he warned that ID cards could become a target for identity theft by organised crime.

Human rights

On 2 February 2005, the British Parliament's Joint Committee on Human Rights questioned the compatibility of the Bill with Article 8 of the European Convention on Human Rights (the right to respect for private life) and Article 14 (the right to non-discrimination), both of which are encapsulated in the Human Rights Act 1998.

Feature creep
Even without new primary legislation, the Identity Cards Act 2006 allowed the potential scope of the scheme to be much greater than that usually publicised by the Government.

For example, Gordon Brown was reported to be "planning a massive expansion of the ID cards project that would widen surveillance of everyday life by allowing high-street businesses to share confidential information with police databases."
Francis Elliott reporting on the development for The Independent noted that "police could be alerted as soon as a wanted person used a biometric-enabled cash card or even entered a building via an iris-scan door".

The wartime National Registration ID card expanded from 3 functions to 39 by the time it was abolished.

Concerns had also been raised following Tony Blair's response to an ID card petition stating that the fingerprint register would be used to compare the fingerprints of the population at large against the records of 900,000 unsolved crimes. Opposition MPs claimed that the use of the biometric data in this way would directly breach promises given during the Commons debate that there would be adequate safeguards preventing the use of ID card data for "fishing expeditions".

Database extent and access
Home Office forecasts envisaged that "265 government departments and as many as 48,000 accredited private sector organisations" would have had access to the database, and that 163 million identity verifications or more would take place each year.
However, the IPS had stated that only the data needed for the passport would have been kept and that organisations that have permission to access the data held on the Register could only have done so with the individual's permission, unless to prevent or investigate a crime.

Vulnerable individuals
The CRE had also recommended that more work was required to protect the interests of vulnerable individuals. For example, people escaping from domestic violence or a forced marriage may have been at risk if their previous names or addresses were disclosed. Minister Meg Hillier, in a letter to The Spectator magazine, claimed that as the ID card would not have someone's address on it, it would protect such a person's privacy in a way currently unavailable.

Identity theft
In May 2005, Tony Blair said "ID cards are needed to stop the soaring costs of identity theft". However, security experts claimed that placing trust in a single document may make identity theft easier, since only this document needs to be targeted.

Technology
Elsewhere, doubts remained concerning the practicability of the scheme. Existing government systems were not appropriate for the issuing to British citizens from 2009.

Tests of facial recognition software dating from 2006 showed error rates of up to 52 per cent for the disabled.

The cards could stop some credit cards from working properly, when kept in the same wallet.

Opposition campaigns
In May 2006, NO2ID launched the "Renew for Freedom" campaign, urging passport holders to renew their passports in the summer of 2006 to delay being entered on the National Identity Register. This followed the comment made by Charles Clarke in the House of Commons that "anyone who feels strongly enough about the linkage [between passports and the ID scheme] not to want to be issued with an ID card in the initial phase will be free to surrender their existing passport and apply for a new passport before the designation order takes effect".

In response, the Home Office said that it was "hard to see what would be achieved, other than incurring unnecessary expense" by renewing passports early. However, the cost of a passport was £51 at the time, then increased in 2006 and 2007 to £72 and was due to rise to £93 after the introduction of ID cards.

On 14 November 2007, the NO2ID opposition group called for financial donations from the 11,360 people who had pledged to contribute to a fighting fund opposing the legislation. The organisation planned to challenge the statutory instruments that were planned to be brought in to enable the ID card scheme.

Baroness Williams and Nick Clegg said in 2007 that they would take part in civil disobedience campaigns by refusing to register for an ID card, or to attend photographic sittings.

Scotland
Although policy on passports and the National Identity Scheme was not an area devolved to the Scottish Government, on 19 November 2008, the Scottish Parliament voted to reject the ID card scheme,  with no votes against the government motion, and only the Scottish Labour MSPs abstaining. In 2005, the previous Labour-Liberal Democrat coalition government had stated that "the proposals for an identity card scheme confine themselves to reserved policy areas only", and that ID cards will not be needed to access devolved services in Scotland, e.g. health, education, the legal system and transport. However the Scottish National Entitlement Card is required to obtain concessionary travel. It can also be used as Proof of Age for young people (Young Scot NEC) and give access to civic services such as libraries and leisure centres depending on the local authority.

Northern Ireland
The introduction of compulsory ID cards to Northern Ireland would likely have provoked serious opposition given the large Nationalist community who regard themselves as Irish and not British. In an effort to counter this, the British Government decided not to include the Union Flag on the card, and had stated that a separate card will be issued to Northern Irish people who identify their nationality as Irish.  The separate card would not have included any statement of nationality and could not have been used as an EEA travel document (as only the Irish Government may issue travel documents for Irish citizens, wherever resident).  Home Secretary Alan Johnson had also stated that the inclusion of Northern Irish people on the National Identity Register of British citizens would not have prevented such people from claiming full Irish citizenship rights.

See also
 Opinion polls on the British national identity card
 Identity document
 "Kiss Ya Lips (No I.D.)", a protest song by Ian Brown
 National Insurance number
 Human rights in the United Kingdom
 Common Travel Area
 Schengen Information System
 Mass surveillance in the United Kingdom
 Work card
 Scottish National Entitlement Card

Notes

References

External links
 Map of centres September 2006
 Online Debate – ID cards and the National Identity Register should be scrapped   August 2007
 UK Borders Agency website information on ID cards for foreign nationals
 Types of identity card IPS page describing what the different cards look like

News stories
 22 November 2007, BBC, Is Brown re-thinking ID cards?
 22 November 2007, BBC, Cameron calls for ID cards halt
 14 September 2006, epolitix.com, Minister defends data-sharing scheme
 7 August 2006, Guardian, Hackers crack new biometric passports
 14 June 2006, epolitix.com, Amnesty for illegal immigrants once identity cards in place?
 24 May 2006, BBC, Lib Dems back the "Renew for Freedom" campaign
 4 April 2006, The Register, Passport rule change anticipates ID refusenik sabotage efforts
 30 March 2006, BBC, Identity cards will be made compulsory if Labour wins the next election
 13 February 2006, The Daily Mirror, Motorists could soon be forced to carry an ID card
 30 January 2006, BBC, Transsexuals 'to get 2 ID cards'
 17 January 2006, The Times, Peers deal Blair blow over '£19bn cost of ID cards'
 8 December 2005, Guardian, A pan-European ID card will make a bad idea even worse
 17 November 2005, BBC, Ex-MI5 chief sparks ID card row
 18 October 2005, The Scotsman, Microsoft security officer: ID cards will lead to 'massive fraud'
 12 October 2005, The Register. support for ID cards collapses
 4 August 2005, BBC, Labour admits ID card 'oversell'
 8 July 2005, BBC, Chales Clarke: ID cards wouldn't stop bomb attacks
 5 July 2005, The Register, "Clarke's ID card cost laundry starts to break surface"
 3 July 2005, The Observer, Rebels ready to face prison over ID cards: Refuseniks will copy Australian tactics to foil scheme
 2 July 2005, Muriel Gray in The Guardian, Nobody has nothing to hide: Identity cards will deprive the innocent of one of their most basic rights
 "ID cards 'will reveal detail of daily life'" – Information commissioner warns of surveillance society
 December 2004 Guardian Legal advice on ID cards kept secret
 December 2004 Guardian If you value your freedom, reject this sinister ID card
 April 2004 Times It is right to experiment with identity cards
April 2004 Bloomberg Identity Card Will Make Fraud Easier
 July 2003 Statewatch Identity cards in the UK – a lesson from history
 July 2002 Daily Telegraph £70 ID card to combine passport and car licence
 September 2001 Guardian ID cards might solve asylum crisis

Guides
 March 2005 London School of Economics An Assessment of the UK Identity Cards Bill and its Implications
 February 2005 Bow Group report The Case Against ID Cards, by Rt Hon Peter Lilley MP
 December 2004 BBC Identity card Q&A
 June 2004 Electricinca An analysis of the British national identity card
 May 2004 The Register Everything you never wanted to know about the UK ID card
 November 2003 Guardian Q&A
 September 2001 Telegraph The case for and against identity cards
 Trevor Mendham UK ID Cards – the case against
 ''A map of the debate on UK ID cards and the related ID databases"", Debategraph

Opposition groups
No2ID: UK campaign against ID Cards and mass surveillance
Defy-ID
Liberty – human rights concerns
Reform
idFolly
Haringey Against Identity Cards

Government databases in the United Kingdom
Immigration to the United Kingdom
Law enforcement in the United Kingdom
United Kingdom Acts of Parliament 2006
United Kingdom
Home Office (United Kingdom)
Human rights in the United Kingdom